Murad Hasratyan (born June 20, 1935) is an Armenian architectural historian.

Biography 

He was born in Yerevan to an educated family. His father, Morus Hasratyan was a renowned historian-philologist, honorary figure of the Armenian SSR, the first student of the Faculty of History at Yerevan State University, later, he was the Director of History Museum of Armenia.

In 1958 he graduated from the Architecture Department of the Yerevan Polytechnic Institute with a diploma of excellence, receiving the qualification "Architect"

At the institute he was taught by the professors Rafayel Israyelyan, Samvel Safaryan, Varazdat Harutyunyan, and the head of his diploma work was Mikayel Mazmanyan.

Career 

As a senior architect, he started to work at the newly opened Yerevan Project Institute, in Gevorg Tamanyan studio. He designed several projects: residential and administrative buildings, schools (after Shirvanzade-1961), designed the plans of the settlement after Lukashin and the settlements of Kanaker Hydro Power Plant (1959-1961)

Since 1964, he worked at Academy of Arts of the Academy of Sciences of Armenia as a junior researcher, then he became the Scientific Secretary of the Institute.

In 1969 he became a Candidate of Sciences with defending his thesis on "“Architectural complexes of Syunik region 16-18th centuries".

He has headed the Architecture Department of the Institute of Arts of the Armenian Academy of Sciences since 1988.

Since 1999 he teaches at the Yerevan State university.

Researches 

M. Hasratyan has measured around 150 monuments in Armenia.

He was the first one to research and put into scientific circulation: Tashi’s monument, early medieval monuments of Ddmashen, Sarakap, the monasteries in Artsakh- Amaras, Dadivank, Khratravank, Gandzasar Monastery, Gtchavank, and numerous churches, including the famous Ghazanchetsots Cathedral, have been measured by the medieval Armenian architectural monuments of the Nagorno-Karabakh region.

In Nakhichevan Hasratyan "has been measuring, analyzing, and putting in scientific circulation many monuments, including the Astrapid Red Monastery, which had been destroyed by the “owners” of Nakhichevan not long after and continues to exist only in M. Hasratyan's assessments and descriptions.

He was the first to explore the Armenian-Byzantine, Armenian-Georgian, Armenian-Iranian architectural relations

Books 

Hasratyan is the author of nearly two dozen books, numerous brochures, hundreds of articles, theses, reviews and encyclopedia articles published in Armenia, Moscow, Kiev, Tbilisi, Paris, Lyon, Vienna, Lisbon, Rome, Venice, Milan, Bologna, Naples , Montreal, Yokohama, Ankara.

Hasratyan's first book was about the architecture of Yerevan, his birthplace, which was published in Moscow on the 2750th anniversary of the founding of Yerevan in 1968, in co-authorship with Varazdat Harutyunyan and Arsen Melikyan in 1968.

The same composition of the author on the occasion of the 50th anniversary of the USSR was published in Moscow in 1972 by the "Architecture of Soviet Armenia"։

For the collective fundamental work of "History of Armenian Art", which authored sections dedicated to the history of Armenian architecture Hasratyan was awarded the 2009 State Prize in Fine Arts.

Co-author of several Armenian architectural history (Yerevan, Russian language, 1968, “Architecture of Soviet Armenia, in Russian language 1972, “Kecharis”, in English and Italian languages, 1982 “Gandzasar”). .

Memberships 

1998-Associate member of Armenia's engineering academy

2006-associate member in the National Academy of Sciences of RA

2015-Associate member of the International Academy of Architecture

Awards 

 State Prize of Armenia, 2009
 Gold Medal of Yerevan
 National Academy of Sciences of Armenia, Prize after Toros Toramanyan for his work “Armenian architecture during Early Christianity period", Moscow 2010
Prime Minister's Commemorative Medal
Central Committee prize winner (1971)
Doctor of Architecture (1993)

See also 

Stepan Mnatsakanian
Alexander Sahinian

References 

1935 births
Architects from Yerevan
Living people
National Polytechnic University of Armenia alumni